Outbound is a 2010 Romanian action film directed by .

Plot
A drama about a woman who seems able to overcome everything for freedom, except for her past mistakes.

Cast 
 Ana Ularu – Matilda
 Andi Vasluianu – Andrei
 Ingrid Bisu – Selena
 Ioana Flora – Lavinia
 Mimi Brănescu – Paul
 Timotei Duma – Toma
  – Virgil

References

External links

2010 action films
2010 films
Romanian action films